Jordan Michael Bleyer (born October 13, 1990), known professionally as Michael Wavves, is an American rapper, singer, and songwriter from Lebanon, Pennsylvania, United States. He released his first EP, Nights on Vine, in October 2018.

Career
Jordan Michael Bleyer began releasing music in 2015, alongside being an eighth grade social studies teacher in Lebanon. In September 2015, he released his first song "No Pressure." In early 2016, he released the song "Bad" featuring American rapper Sammy Adams. He began 2018 by releasing the song "Ride Out" featuring artists Lilo Key & Danny Asroff. In July 2018, He released the song "On The Low..." featuring American rapper Trizzy. Following the release of "On The Low..." he released his first EP Nights on Vine in October 2018. For his first release in 2019, he teamed up with artist Kevin Flum & released the song "On Me".

In the summer of 2019, Michael Wavves interviewed with Respect Magazine on the release of his latest EP Purple Heart. Purple Heart received local media attention by debuting at No. 12 on the iTunes R&B charts. Shortly after the release of Purple Heart, he gained local attention by performing the song "Undrwtr" live on local news station Good Day PA in Harrisburg, Pennsylvania. In 2020, Wavves released several collaborative singles including collaborations with international electronic producers Hoober, Noixes, and others.

Discography

Albums and EPs

Singles

References

1990 births
Living people